Lauren Marie Bruton (born 22 November 1992) is an English football forward, who plays for FA Women's Championship side Charlton Athletic. She was born in Luton.

Club career
Bruton began playing football at the age of eight years for Luton Town Ladies FC where she netted over 200 goals until the age of 15 before joining Arsenal. A little over 12 months later she made her FA Women's Premier League debut for Arsenal Ladies in December 2008, playing in the 7–0 win at home to Fulham.

In September 2013, Bruton left Arsenal for Reading Women, who were managed by her former Arsenal teammate Jayne Ludlow.

International career
Bruton scored on her debut cap for the England Under-17s side, against Greece. She was part of the England side that finished fourth at the 2008 FIFA U-17 Women's World Cup in New Zealand. In July 2009 she was part of the English Under-19s squad that won the 2009 UEFA Women's Under-19 Championship in Belarus.

She was called into the senior England squad for the first time by coach Phil Neville in June 2018, as a replacement for the injured Jordan Nobbs and Isobel Christiansen. She remained an unused substitute for England's 3–1 2019 FIFA Women's World Cup qualification – UEFA Group 1 win over Russia in Moscow.

She made her full international debut in a 2019 FIFA Women's World Cup qualifying match against Kazakhstan on 4 September 2018.

Honours and awards
 Team 
 Under-19 European Championship: 2009
 FA Women's Cup: 2010/2011, 2012/2013
 WSL: 2011, 2012
 WSL Cup: 2012, 2013
 Premier League: 2009/2010

Personal life
Bruton attended Cardinal Newman Catholic School in Luton.

References

External links
 
 UEFA player profile
 Arsenal player profile
 Reading player profile

1992 births
Living people
Footballers from Luton
Arsenal W.F.C. players
English women's footballers
FA Women's National League players
Women's Super League players
Reading F.C. Women players
Women's association football wingers
Women's association football forwards
England women's international footballers
England women's youth international footballers
Charlton Athletic W.F.C. players
Women's Championship (England) players